Life Is Beautiful (also known as Betrayed) is a 1979 Italian-Soviet romantic drama directed by Grigory Chukhray.

Plot
The action takes place in an unnamed country (in foreign versions of the film the country is Portugal during Salazar's reign), ruled by a military junta which violently suppresses any free thought. Antonio Murillo is a former military pilot who was dismissed from the army for refusing to sink a ship loaded with refugees. Now he drives a taxi and periodically becomes a witness to the despotism of the authorities. His girlfriend Mary, waitress, is a member of an underground movement fighting against the dictatorship. Antonio, for all his dislike of the junta is not interested in politics, his dream is to save money and to become a pilot again, and to own a private plane. But once he drives a man on his taxi, who turns out to be on the side of the opposition. This causes him to come to the attention of the special services. Because of that provocateur he ends up going to prison, where there are several members of the underground and ends up subjected to torture. Through ingenuity and mechanic skills he manages to save the life of underground fighters, disrupting the arranged provocation caused by the warden, and then organize an escape from prison. Together with Maria, Antonio in a stolen taxi gets away from the police, and then uses a hijacked plane to leave the country.

Cast 

Giancarlo Giannini: Antonio Murillo
Ornella Muti: Maria
Stefano Madia: Paco
Enzo Fiermonte: Maria's uncle
Luigi Montini: episode
Regimantas Adomaitis: investigator  Perez (voiced by Vadim Spiridonov)
Otar Koberidze: Alvarado (voiced by Vladimir Druzhnikov)
Juozas Budraitis: Gomes
 Yevgeni Lebedev: Rostao
 Stanislav Chekan:  prisoner
 Igor Yasulovich:  prisoner
 Mikhail Remizov:  Osario

References

External links

Life Is Beautiful at Variety Distribution

1979 films
Italian romantic drama films
Russian romantic drama films
Mosfilm films
Soviet romantic drama films
1979 romantic drama films
Films set in Lisbon
Political thriller films
Soviet multilingual films
Italian multilingual films
1979 multilingual films
Films scored by Armando Trovajoli

Films directed by Grigori Chukhrai
1970s Italian films